Aram Rehob was an early Aramean kingdom, of which the chief city was Rehob or Beth-Rehob, associated with Aram-Zobah as hostile to King David. Num. xiii.21 and Judges xviii.28 place a Beth-Rehob in the Lebanon region near Tel Dan. Moore (Commentary on Judges, p. 399) conjecturally identifies it with Paneas.

See also

References

Sources

External links
 

Aramean states